Adriana Puiggrós (born September 12, 1941) is an Argentine writer, academic and politician.

Life
Puiggrós was born in Buenos Aires in 1941. Her father was  who was a historian and a communist. He changed political direction and joined the Peronist party, which was anti-Marxist, during the 1950s. Her father became the rector of the University of Buenos Aires in the early 1970s and Adriana was elected dean of the Philosophy faculty.

She is a member of the Broad Front political party and on 17 December 2011 she was elected president of the party with Alberto Weretilneck as vice-president.

In 2021 she was an adviser to the President Alberto Fernández. She was involved in a dispute over when to get children to return to school during the pandemic. Horacio Rodríguez Larreta was arguing for a date in mid February, but Puiggros argued that it should be delayed until March when the teachers could be vaccinated.

References

External links

1941 births
Living people
Politicians from Buenos Aires
Argentine women writers
Broad Front (Argentina) politicians
Writers from Buenos Aires
Members of the Argentine Chamber of Deputies elected in Buenos Aires Province